Käfer may refer to:

Volkswagen "beetle" (German: Käfer) models
Volkswagen Beetle
Volkswagen New Beetle
Karoline Käfer (born 1954), Austrian athlete